Castle Douglas railway station served the town of Castle Douglas, Dumfries and Galloway, Scotland from 1859 to 1965 on the Castle Douglas and Dumfries Railway.

History 
The station opened on 7 November 1859 by the Glasgow and South Western Railway. To the south was the goods yard and to the north was an engine shed. There were two signal boxes, one to the east and one at the junction to the west. The lines for the goods yard were removed in 1959 and the station, as well as the signal boxes, was closed on 14 June 1965.

References

External links 

Disused railway stations in Dumfries and Galloway
Railway stations in Great Britain opened in 1859
Railway stations in Great Britain closed in 1965
Beeching closures in Scotland
Former Glasgow and South Western Railway stations
1859 establishments in Scotland
1965 disestablishments in Scotland
Castle Douglas